The 2008 Achamkhara incident refers to the armed confrontation, that took place on July 9, 2008, on the flanks of Mount Achamkhara in the internationally unrecognised Republic of Abkhazia, between Abkhazian and Georgian troops.

Background
At the time of the incident, Mount Achamkhara was located near the de facto border between the self-declared Republic of Abkhazia and the formerly Georgian-controlled Kodori Gorge.

The incident
The claims of both sides are different, with conflicting versions of the events and there isn't any independent confirmation, on what took place.

The Abkhazian view
Abkhazia claims, that at 9:25 a.m., its security post on Mount Achamkhara was raided by around 10 Georgian attackers, using automatic weapons and grenade launchers. Two of its reservists were injured and had to be hospitalised.

The Georgian view
Georgia claims, that its policemen were attacked by Abkhazian troops, while they were securing the Achamkhara heights in anticipation of a UNOMIG visit to the Kvabchara Valley. It further claims, that 3 of its police officers were injured and they in turn had killed 4 Abkhazian assailants.

UNOMIG investigation
Both sides appealed to the UNOMIG, with the wish to investigate the incident, which was started on June 10. It hasn't revealed anything yet.

References

Achamkhara Incident, 2008
Abkhaz–Georgian conflict
Achamkhara Incident, 2008
July 2008 events in Asia